Knockbreda Football Club (formerly Knockbreda Parish) is a semi-professional, Northern Irish football club playing in the NIFL Championship. They hail from Belfast and play their home matches at Breda Park, on the Upper Braniel Road located in the east of the city. The club was formed after the Second World War, c. 1947. and played in the Irish Churches' League before joining the Northern Amateur Football League in 1989. Intermediate status was achieved on promotion to Division 1B in 1997. In 2009, the club was admitted to the IFA Championship

History
Knockbreda Football Club was formed in 1947. Originally Knockbreda Parish, they played their football for 42 years in the Irish Churches' League, before joining the Northern Amateur Football League in 1989. Starting in Division 2C, ‘Breda won promotion of 2A in the first three seasons.

Off the field, the committee realised they would have to make some major changes in order to become an Intermediate Club. In 1996, they acquired the current facilities at Upper Braniel, and after winning 2A, were promoted to 1B that same season. Promotion to 1A soon followed, and the club enjoyed a three-year stint at that level, before joining the Premier Division in 2000. After relegation in 2007, the club spent a year in 1A before promotion to the re-vamped IFA Championship 2 in 2009. During the spell in the NIAL, the club won the Clarence Cup twice, the Border Cup once, but by far the greatest success was the WKD Irish Intermediate Cup in 2009. The early driving force behind the club was one of its founders, Fred Duke who died in 2010. For the last two decades the club's main driving force, beginning in the Churches' League right up the IFA Championship, has been one of the current directors and Secretary, Colin Russell.

After four years in Championship 2, in 2012–13 the club won promotion to Championship 1 for the first time.

Current squad

Honours

Intermediate honours
IFA Championship 2 (level 3): 1
2012–13
Irish Intermediate Cup: 1
2008–09
Border Cup: 1
2004–05

References

External links
   Official Website
  Official Twitter Page
  Official Facebook Page

 

Association football clubs in Northern Ireland
Association football clubs established in 1948
NIFL Championship clubs
Association football clubs in County Down
1948 establishments in Northern Ireland